Mikhail Mikhailovich Markin (born 21 November 1993) is a Russian football striker. He plays for FC Leningradets Leningrad Oblast.

Club career
He made his debut in the FNL for FC Mordovia Saransk on 14 June 2011 in a game against FC Baltika Kaliningrad. He made his Russian Premier League debut for Mordovia on 31 August 2012 in a game against FC Zenit Saint Petersburg.

On 18 June 2019, he signed a contract with FC Baltika Kaliningrad for two years with an additional one-year extension option.

References

External links

1993 births
People from Mordovia
Living people
Russian footballers
Association football forwards
Russia youth international footballers
FC Mordovia Saransk players
Russian Premier League players
FC Khimki players
FC Tyumen players
FC Zenit-2 Saint Petersburg players
FC Baltika Kaliningrad players
FC Torpedo Moscow players
FC Urozhay Krasnodar players
FC Leningradets Leningrad Oblast players
Sportspeople from Mordovia